Tindefjellbreen is a glacier in the municipality of Stryn in Vestland county, Norway. The glacier is in the mountains east of the lake Lovatnet and south of the lake Oppstrynsvatn.

See also
List of glaciers in Norway

References

Stryn
Glaciers of Vestland